Stalachtis halloweeni is a species of butterfly of the family Riodinidae. It is found in Guyana.

References

Butterflies described in 2006
Riodininae